Ranking is a surname. Notable people with the surname include:

 John Ranking (1910–1959), English rower
 William Harcourt Ranking (1814–1867), English physician, medical editor, and photographer

See also
 Rankin (name)
 Rankine